Libertad Municipality may refer to the following places in the Venezuela:

Libertad Municipality, Anzoátegui
Libertad Municipality, Táchira

Municipality name disambiguation pages